Leptobrachella aerea is a species of frogs in the family Megophryidae. It is known from Vilabouli District, Savannakhet Province, Laos (where its type locality is) and from Hà Tĩnh, Nghệ An, Thanh Hóa, and Quảng Bình Provinces of Vietnam.

Description
Leptobrachella aerea males measure  and females  in snout-vent length. It is morphologically most similar to Leptobrachella oshanensis. Male L. aerea have been found to be calling from crevices between boulders, on rocks, and on stream banks in both June and November, suggesting that breeding may occur throughout the year. To the human ear, this call is a high-pitched, rapid chirping.

Specimens collected from Vietnam were slightly different and seem to represent two other lineages.

Habitat and conservation
It some degree of habitat degradation, but probably requires that some evergreen or semi-evergreen riparian vegetation remains. It is known from several protected areas in Vietnam: Phong Nha-Ke Bang National Park, Pu Huong Nature Reserve, Ky Anh-Ke Go Reserve, and Xuan Lien Nature Reserve.

References

aerea
Frogs of Asia
Amphibians of Laos
Amphibians of Vietnam
Amphibians described in 2010
Taxa named by Stephen J. Richards
Taxa named by Jodi Rowley